Enscepastra plagiopa is a species of moth of the family Coleophoridae. It is known from South Africa.

References

Endemic moths of South Africa
Coleophoridae
Moths of Africa
Moths described in 1920